Walk with Me in Hell is a 2008 live DVD by American metal band Lamb of God. On May 1, 2008, Lamb of God stated via Myspace that their new live DVD, Walk with Me in Hell, would be released on July 1, 2008. The DVD is two discs long and has nearly five hours of footage. It contains the feature documentary Walk with Me in Hell and multiple live performance extras from across the globe on the Sacrament World Tour as well as the additional full-length feature “Making of Sacrament” plus Lamb of God's entire performance at the Download Festival 2007, where they performed in front of over 72,000 fans. Extras include deleted scenes, live performance videos for various tour stops, the official music video for “Redneck,” and a “Making of ‘Redneck’” documentary.

Track listing 
All songs written and composed by Lamb of God.

Disc one
Documentary
"Setup to Fail" (The Unholy Alliance tour)
"Playing the Game" (Sacrament release day)
"The Be All, End All" (Megadeth tour)
"A One Eighty Shift" (Japan)
"Speed Boats and Koalas" (Australia)
"It's a Travesty" (The Unholy Alliance Europe)
"Summon the Devil" (Conan & The Grammies)
"Better Than Nascar" (US Headline tour)
"They Got a Bar Here?" (Return to Australia)
"As Foreign as It Gets" (Return to Japan)
"Payoff?" (European festivals)
"Big Shoes to Fill" (Ozzfest)
"Crickets" (Heaven and Hell UK)
"Time Served" (Arena Headline tour)

Live
"Redneck" (from the Unholy Alliance US)
"Again We Rise" (from the Megadeth tour)
"Walk with Me in Hell" (from the Unholy Alliance Europe)
"Now You've Got Something to Die For" (from European festivals)
"Blacken the Cursed Sun" (from Ozzfest)
"Pathetic" (from the Arena Headline tour)

Disc two
The Making of Sacrament

Complete Download Festival Performance 
note that the DVD says it is the "complete uncut performance" when, in fact, they do cut out parts in between songs*

"Laid to Rest"
"Again We Rise"
"Walk with Me in Hell"
"Pathetic"
"Now You've Got Something to Die For"
"Blacken the Cursed Sun"
"Redneck"
"Black Label"

Deleted Scenes
Japan
Australia
United States
Europe
"Redneck" music video
Behind the scenes of the "Redneck" music video shoot

There has been some confusion amongst UK fans, as UK pressings of the DVD do not seem to contain the deleted scenes. So far, no word as to why this is has been made by the band or anyone in association with the band.

Personnel 

 Randy Blythe – vocals
 Mark Morton – lead guitar
 Willie Adler – rhythm guitar
 John Campbell – bass guitar
 Chris Adler – drums

External links
 www.lamb-of-god.com
Video Report of New York Premiere DVD Party on Metal Injection
 Facebook

Lamb of God (band) video albums
2008 live albums
Heavy metal video albums
Epic Records live albums
Epic Records video albums